[Untitled] is the seventh and final studio album by American indie rock band mewithoutYou. The record was produced by Will Yip.

On August 13, 2018, mewithoutYou released the first single off of the not-yet-announced [Untitled], "Julia (or, 'Holy to the LORD' on the Bells of Horses)". At the same time of the single's release, the band tweeted a link to a page on their website containing only a countdown timer.  The timer finished at 12:00 am Eastern time (05:00 UTC) on August 17, 2018, and the band announced they would be releasing their seventh studio album, [Untitled], on October 5, 2018.  In addition to the full-length album announcement, mewithoutYou digitally released a "partner" EP also titled [untitled].

Track listing
Music by mewithoutYou, lyrics by Aaron Weiss.

References

2018 albums
MewithoutYou albums
Albums produced by Will Yip